Mark P. Macapagal (born September 20, 1979 in Pampanga) is a Filipino professional basketball player. He last played with the Meralco Bolts. He plays the shooting guard and small forward positions.

After playing in Ginebra where he impressed many with his good outside shooting, Macapagal was involved in a four-team trade that sent him to Coca-Cola.

In the 2009–10 season, he stepped up as the primary scorer for the Coca-Cola Tigers as he averaged 11 points, 1.8 rebounds, 1.9 assists in 25.5 minutes. However, his performance was not enough for Coca-Cola to advance to the playoffs.

References

1979 births
Living people
Barako Bull Energy players
Filipino men's basketball players
San Sebastian Stags basketball players
Basketball players from Pampanga
Shooting guards
Small forwards
Barangay Ginebra San Miguel players
Powerade Tigers players
Meralco Bolts players
NorthPort Batang Pier players
Filipino sportsperson-politicians
TNT Tropang Giga draft picks